The Cathedral Church of the Assumption of the Blessed Virgin Mary, Tuam, commonly called Tuam Cathedral, is the cathedral for the Roman Catholic Archdiocese of Tuam in Ireland. The geographic remit of the Archdiocese includes half of County Galway, half of County Mayo and part of County Roscommon. Prior to the English Reformation, the diocesan cathedral was St Mary's, which was constructed in the 14th century, on the site of an earlier building. Upon the appointment of William Mullaly by Queen Elizabeth I of England as Archbishop of Tuam for the Established church, the Roman Catholic clergy were dispossessed of the cathedral. Almost three centuries were to elapse before a relaxation of the Penal Laws permitted the building of a replacement – the current edifice.

Burials
John de Burgh (Archbishop) – in the Oratory of St. Jarlath.
John MacHale, Archbishop of Tuam – before the high altar
Joseph Cunnane, Archbishop of Tuam – in the cathedral grounds

Gallery

Bibliography
 Jeremy Williams  A Companion Guide to Architecture in Ireland 1837–1921, Irish Academic Press 1994
 Peter Galloway  The Cathedrals of Ireland, The Institute of Irish Studies, The Queen's University of Belfast, 1992

See also
List of cathedrals in Ireland

References

External links

 Catholic Encyclopedia: Tuam
 Tuam Guide Image

Buildings and structures in Tuam
Religion in Tuam
Roman Catholic Archdiocese of Tuam
Roman Catholic cathedrals in the Republic of Ireland
Roman Catholic churches completed in 1837
19th-century Roman Catholic church buildings in Ireland
19th-century churches in the Republic of Ireland